The Karnataka Tamils are a social community of Tamil language speakers living in Bangalore, capital city of the Indian state of Karnataka and Mysore, Mandya, Kolar, Chamrajnagar, and other districts of old Mysore Kingdom.  According to The Hindu newspaper, Tamil-speaking settlers migrated to Bangalore in four major waves, the first after the 10th century; the second during the Vijayanagara period; and the third, in the 18th century, after the need for government service required by British East India Company who built the train tracks in Bangalore. Lastly now most Tamilians move to Bangalore for work. However some may say both kannadiga and Tamil were there from the first.  According to census 1991, people speaking Tamil as mother tongue in Bangalore formed about 21%. There are 2.1 million Tamils living in Karnataka as of 2011 Census report.

History 
According to Srinivas, at the end of the tenth century, the Cholas from Tamil Nadu began to penetrate in areas east of Bangalore; it later began to extend its control over parts of present-day Bangalore, such as Domlur on the eastern side of the city. Around 1004, during the reign of Rajendra Chola I, the Cholas defeated the Western Gangas, and captured Bangalore. In the 19th century, Bangalore essentially became a twin city, with the "pētē", whose residents were predominantly Kannadigas, and the "cantonment" created by the British, whose residents were predominantly British and Tamils.

Communities

Arcot Mudaliars 
Arcot Mudaliars are one of the early settlers of the Bangalore city after the  British East India company. They were mostly settled in the Cantonment. Major government monuments in Old bangalore including Chinnaswamy stadium,Town hall were once belonged to the Arcot Mudaliar community. Major roads in Old bangalore are named after the stalwarts of the community. Many temples, hospitals and schools including Annasamy Mudaliar general hospital at Old bangalore managed by the Arcot Mudaliar trusts.

Hebbar Iyengar 
Hebbar Iyengars were formerly an endogamous group and constitute a part of the Iyengar sub-caste of the Karnataka Brahmins. They are traditionally followers of Ramanuja and Vedanta Desika. They hail primarily from Hassan, Mysore, Tumkur, Bangalore, and surrounding areas in southern Karnataka.
The characteristic dialect of the Hebbar Iyengars is called Hebbar Tamil and is a mixture of Iyengar Tamil, Kannada and Sanskrit. The group's primary mother tongue is Hebbar Tamil which is spoken in most Hebbar Iyengar households, though Kannada and English are increasingly taking its place. A peculiar characteristic of Iyengar Tamil (including Hebbar Tamil) is its retention of divine or holy food terminology. For example, Iyengar Tamil makes distinctions between potable ([t̪iːrt̪o]) and non-potable water ([d͡ʒʌlo]), the former considered sacred but both borrowed from Sanskrit. Standard Tamil exhibits only the generic term for 'water'. The Vaishnavite Brahmins of Southern Karnataka use the Tamil surname "Iyengar" and are believed to have migrated during the time of the 11th century Vaishnavite saint Ramanujacharya. Most Iyengars in Karnataka use sub-dialects of Iyengar Tamil.

Thigala 
The Thigala or Tigala are a Tamil social group found in Tamil Nadu and Karnataka states of India, and particularly the city of Bangalore. They are likely a sub-caste of the numerous Vanniyar caste.  Every year, the Thigalas celebrate a festival called Karaga. The story of the Karaga is also rooted in the Mahabharata. Draupadi is the community deity of the Vanniyakula Kshatriyas. The Thigala in Karnataka speak a mixture of Kannada and Tamil

Thigala and Bangalore Karaga 
Bangalore Karaga is primarily a well-known tradition of Thigala community in southern Karnataka. The Karaga festival is generally led by the men of the community. There is a legend which gives them this privilege. Thigalas believe that in the last part of the Mahabharatha, when the Pandavas were shown a glimpse of hell, one last Asura (Demon) called Tripurasura was still alive. At this time, Draupadi, the Pandava's wife, took the form of Shakthi devi. She created a huge army of soldiers called the Veerakumaras. After defeating the Asura, the soldiers asked Shakthi Devi to stay back with them. Though she had to go back, she promised them that she would come to stay with them every year during the first full moon of the first month of the Hindu calendar Kempe Gowda  built the Bangalore fort and the town in 1537 A D. And moved his capital from Yelahanka to the new Bangalore. .

Demographics 
In the Bangalore Central Lok Sabha constituency there are about 5.5 lakh Tamil voters,  out of the total 14 lakh voters, and Tamilians play a key role in deciding the winning candidate. According to Indian Express news, out of 1.67 lakh voters in Shivajinagar, 92,000 are Tamil speaking people. Tamils form 3.46% of the total population of the state. Almost 5 million Tamils live outside Tamil Nadu, inside India. There has been a recorded presence of Tamil-speaking people in Southern Karnataka since the 10th century.

Suburbs of the Bangalore Cantonment (Fraser Town, Murphy Town, Shivajinagar, Halasuru, Benson Town, Austin Town, Richards Town, Cox Town, Richmond Town, Neelasandra and Viveknagar) have a large Tamil population. They trace their ancestry to the large number of Tamil speaking soldiers, suppliers and workers who were brought into the Bangalore Civil and Military Station, by the British Army, after the fall of Tippu Sultan. The Bangalore Cantonment was directly under the administration of the British Madras Presidency till 1949, when it was handed over to the Mysore State. Significant Tamil-speaking populations are also found in areas of Bangalore not part of the Cantonment such as Chamarajpet, Kalasipalya, Sriramapura, Malleswaram, Vyalikaval, Hebbal, Vidyaranyapura and Yelahanka as well as the eastern and south-eastern localities of Bangalore which are in proximity to the IT Corridor (Whitefield, Electronics City and the Outer Ring Road) such as Indiranagar, Banaswadi, Koramangala, BTM Layout, HSR Layout, Bannerghatta Road, J. P. Nagar and Marathahalli among others. Many of the Tamilians living within or close to the IT corridor of Bangalore are first-generation immigrants who have migrated from Tamil Nadu to work in the IT industry in the city.

List of  notable Chola temples

Tamil inscriptions

Temple inscriptions

Chokkanathaswamy Temple, Domlur

The Chokkanathaswamy Temple is a 10th-century Chola temple, located in Domlur. There are a number of Tamil inscriptions in the temple. Domlur is called as Tombalur or Desimanikkapattanam in these inscriptions. Chakravarthi Posalaviraramanatha Deva has left inscriptions with directions to temple authorities of his kingdom. Further some inscriptions record the tributes, taxes and tolls made to the temple by Devaraya II of Vijayanagar Empire, which state the houses, wells, land around Tombalur were offered to the deity Sokkapperumal. Another Tamil inscription dated 1270 talks about 2 door posts being donated by Alagiyar. Yet another inscription in Tamil details  Talaikkattu and his wife donating lands from Jalapalli village and Vinnamangalam tank to the deity. A 1290AD inscription talks about donation of ten pens from the revenue of Tommalur by Poysala vira Ramananda.

Someshwara Temple, Begur
The Someshware temple at Madivala is one of Bangalore's oldest, dating back to the Chola period. There are a number of Tamil and Grantha inscriptions on the outer walls of the temple. The oldest of these inscriptions dates to 1247 AD talks about a land grants "below the big tank of Vengalur" by a Veppur (modern Begur) resident. Other inscriptions also talk about other land grants including those done during the reigns of Ballala III and Rajendra Chola. Another instrciption dated 1365 talks about land grand at Tamaraikkirai (which translates to 'lotus pond bank' in Tamil, and according to HS Gopala Rao, Secretary of the Karnataka Itihasa Academy refers to the present day Tavarekere suburb.

Village inscriptions

Kadugodi
A Tamil inscription from dating 1043AD exists in Kadugodi,  from the period of Rajendra Chola I, which describes the construction of the Pattanduru Lake, and Ganesh, Durga and Kshetrapaala temples by Chola chieftain Raja Raja Velan son of Permadi Gavunda.

Marathahalli
Doddanekkundi village, located North of Marathahalli, and much older than Marathahalli, has two ancient inscriptions in Tamil. The first inscription dated 1304, mentions the village name as Nerkundi and talks about the existence of a fort around the village constructed in 1304. The second inscription talks about the Hoysala king Ballala III granting the entire revenue of the Doddanekkundi village to the Shivagange Temple. There is also a Telugu inscription in Marathahalli. According to scholars, this shows the use of Tamil and Telugu in Bangalore, much before the reign of Krishnadevaraya of the Vijaynagar Kingdom.

British Period inscriptions in Tamil

Madras Sappers War Memorial, Brigade Road
A war memorial raised by the British to commemorate the lives lost in different wars by the Madras Sappers Regiment. It details the number of British officers, Indian officers and soldiers who died fighting during Second Opium War in China, Third Anglo-Burmese War(1885–87), World War I, Mesopotamia (modern Iraq) (1916–18), East Africa (1914-18) and the North West Frontier (1915). The soldiers fell during the Indian wars of Assaye, Seringapatam, Seetabuldee and Sholinghur are also acknowledged. The inscriptions are both in English and Tamil.

Broadway, Shivajinagar
When an encroached storm water drain was cleared in Shivajinagar, a huge plaque dating back to the 19th century was found. The stone, shows the progress of the building of the British Bangalore Cantonment. It reads 'This stone laid across the main channel in 1868 and worn by the feet of two generations was set up to mark the opening of this bridge and road on 16 February 1922'. The inscription is in English, Tamil and Urdu. According to SK Aruni, deputy director of the  Indian Council of Historical Research, Tamil was used as all the workers of the British were Tamil people, and Urdu to communicate to the Hindustani men working for the British.

References 

Bibliography and sources

Bangalore
People from Bangalore
Culture of Bangalore